Cytoplasm-to-vacuole targeting (Cvt) is an autophagy-related pathway in yeast. Under vegetative conditions it delivers hydrolases, such as aminopeptidase 1 (Ape1), to the vacuole. This makes the cvt pathway the only known biosynthetic pathway to utilize the machinery of autophagy for operation.

Nomenclature 

The abbreviation Cvt comes from the emphasis Cytoplasm vacuole targeting, not from Cytoplasm-to-vacuole targeting.

References 

Cellular processes